Allophylus zimmermannianus is a species of plant in the family Sapindaceae. It is found in Kenya and Tanzania.

References

zimmermannianus
Vulnerable plants
Taxonomy articles created by Polbot